The Blues Kitchen is a BBQ restaurant & live music venue specialising in rare and vintage bourbon. The restaurant currently operates at three sites in London; on Camden High Street near Camden Town Station, on Curtain Road near Old Street Station in Shoreditch and on Acre Lane near Brixton Station. A forth venue is expected to open on Quay Street in Manchester in early 2021.

History 

The Blues Kitchen was founded by The Columbo Group's directors Steve Ball and Riz Shaikh, both of whom were voted in the "Top 1000 Most Influential" list by the Evening Standard in 2014 and 2015 in Camden in October 2009.

The Columbo Group also own London venues The Old Queen's Head, XOYO, The Jazz Café, The Camden Assembly and Phonox, and was awarded with the Best Late Night Operator 2015 award by The Morning Advertiser's Publican Awards.

Music and influences 

The team behind The Blues Kitchen venues spent many months exploring the Deep South of the United States. Visiting Texas, Tennessee, Alabama, New Orleans, Mississippi, Arkansas and Kentucky, they met and spent time with numerous chefs, Juke joint owners & musicians.

All of The Blues Kitchen venues serve Southern, pit style, slow smoked barbecue, burgers and chicken wings.

The music programme hosts new and established Blues, rock & roll, soul, and Americana artists nightly.

Previous shows have included performances from Seasick Steve, Gary Clark Jr, Martha Reeves & The Vandellas, Mud Morganfield, The Libertines, Kitty, Daisy & Lewis, Huey Morgan, Andrew Weatherall, Mystery Jets, and The Jim Jones Revue.

The Blues Kitchen also hosts weekly live sessions and interviews on their YouTube & Podcast channels. Episodes are presented by The Blues Kitchen's Creative Director Liam Hart and his lifelong friend Gareth Ragg.

The Blues Kitchen Channel has recently hosted guests such as: Ronnie Wood (of The Rolling Stones), Bobby Gillespie (of Primal Scream), Nathaniel Rateliff, Margo Price, Graham Nash, Steve Earle, The Blind Boys of Alabama, The Budos Band, Lee Fields, Jimmie Vaughan, Marcus King, George Clinton (of Parliament-Funkadelic), Rich Robinson (of The Black Crowes), Gary Clark Jr, Robert Cray, Wilko Johnson, White Denim, Cage the Elephant, Temples, Black Rebel Motorcycle Club, Seasick Steve and Charles Bradley.

Since 2009, The Blues Kitchen Podcast has had over 3 million downloads worldwide, and regularly features on the top spot of the ITunes Alternative radio charts in the UK, Europe and the US.

The Blues Kitchen is also the current record holder for the World's Longest Musical Jam, having hosted a 100-hour non-stop music session in June 2019 to celebrate their tenth birthday. The three-day event saw 500+ artists take to the stage, raising over £10,000 for the Help Refugees & Camden Music Trust charities.

See also
 List of barbecue restaurants

References

External links
  Official website
 Blues Bar puts on a Mighty Jam on ITV.com
 Bar sets World Record with 50 hour gig and one rocker stayed for the whole thing on metro.co.uk 
 Podcast and Internet Radio previews on telegraph.co.uk
 London's best new restaurants on thrillist.com
 Wonderland Loves: The Blues Kitchen on wonderlandmagazine.com

Barbecue restaurants
Restaurants in London